Redstone 4 may refer to:

 Mercury-Redstone 4, a 1961 spaceflight
 Redstone 4, codename for the 2018 Microsoft Windows 10 version 1803 update